Le Tueur is a 2007 French thriller film directed by Cédric Anger.

Plot
It is Christmas Eve in Paris. Leo Zimmerman is a businessman who lives for his beloved little daughter's smile. Outwardly, his life is exemplary. However, when Dimitri Kopas walks into his office, pretending to be a normal client, Leo understands that a contract is out on his head and that the young man has come to town to kill him. Overcome with anxiety and paranoia, no longer able to sleep, Leo decides to meet the killer face to face and to broker a strange deal.

Cast
 Gilbert Melki as Léo  
 Grégoire Colin as Kopas
 Mélanie Laurent as Stella
 Sophie Cattani as Sylvia
 Xavier Beauvois as Franzen
 Jeanne Allard as Alana

Festivals
 European Film Festival in Estoril
 Athens French Film Festival
 Rotterdam International Film Festival
 FilmFest München
 Los Angeles Festival City of Lights, City of Angels
 Karlovy Vary International Film Festival (Variety Critic's Choice)
 Fantasia International Film Festival in Montréal
 Nominated Louis-Delluc Award for Best First Film

References

External links
 
 Canadian Distributor: Evokative Films
 Variety
 Twitchfilm
 Eye Weekly
 Film Threat
Gazette

2007 films
French thriller films
2007 thriller films
French neo-noir films
2000s French films